Sandro Tovalieri,  (born 25 February 1965) is an Italian professional football coach and a former player, who played as a forward. He serves as a coach for the A.S. Roma youth sector.

Playing career
Tovalieri, nicknamed "Il Cobra", was born in Pomezia. He played for seven seasons (150 games, 48 goals) in the Italian Serie A for A.S. Roma, Avellino, A.S. Bari, Atalanta B.C., A.C. Reggiana 1919, Cagliari Calcio, U.C. Sampdoria and Perugia Calcio.

With Roma he won the Serie A title during the 1982–83 season, although he remained an unused substitute throughout the entire campaign and did not make a single appearance; he subsequently also won the Coppa Italia during the 1985–86 season, scoring a goal in the final. He later played in the UEFA Cup for U.C. Sampdoria.

Honours

Player

Club
Roma
 Serie A champion: 1982–83.
 Coppa Italia winner: 1985–86.

Individual
 One of Top 10 scorers in Serie A: 1994–95 (tied for 5th place, 17 goals), 1996–97 (4th place, 16 goals).

References

1965 births
Living people
Association football forwards
Italian footballers
Italy under-21 international footballers
Serie A players
Serie B players
Serie C players
Delfino Pescara 1936 players
S.S. Arezzo players
A.S. Roma players
U.S. Avellino 1912 players
A.C. Ancona players
S.S.C. Bari players
Atalanta B.C. players
A.C. Reggiana 1919 players
Cagliari Calcio players
U.C. Sampdoria players
A.C. Perugia Calcio players
Ternana Calcio players
Italian football managers